Southern Military District (Milo S), originally I Military District was a Swedish military district, a command of the Swedish Armed Forces that had operational control over Southern Sweden, for most time of its existence corresponding to the area covered by the counties of Malmöhus, Kristianstad (now joined as Skåne County), Blekinge, Kronoberg, Jönköping and Kalmar. The headquarters of Milo S were located in Kristianstad.

History 
Milo S was created in 1966 along with five other military districts as part of a reorganisation of the administrative divisions of the Swedish Armed Forces. It can be seen as the successor of the I Military District (I. militärområdet) created in 1942, but that did not have the same tasks as Milo S. The military district consisted of the land covered by the above-mentioned counties, with the exception of a small part of northern Kalmar County which instead was part of the Eastern Military District (Milo Ö) until 1983 when the whole county's area was incorporated into Milo S. In 1993, the number of military districts of Sweden was decreased to three, and as a consequence of that, Western Military District (Milo V) was merged with Milo S to form a new southern military district. In 2000, these last three military districts were disbanded and the command for the whole of Sweden was placed at the Swedish Armed Forces Headquarters, in accordance with the Defence Act of 2000.

Units 1989
In peacetime the Southern Military District consisted of the following units, which were training recruits for wartime units:

 Southern Military District (Milo S), in Kristianstad
 Army units:
 P 2 - Scanian Dragoon Regiment, in Hässleholm
 P 6/Fo 14 - North Scanian Regiment / Kristianstad Defense District, in Kristianstad
 Army Mechanic School
 P 7/Fo 11 - South Scanian Regiment / Malmö Defense District, in Ystad
 I 11/Fo 16/18 - Kronoberg Regiment / Kronoberg and Kalmar Defense Districts, in Växjö
 I 12/Fo 17 - Northern Småland Regiment / Jönköping Defense District, in Eksjö
 A 3 - Wendes Artillery Regiment, in Kristianstad
 Lv 4 - Scanian Anti-Aircraft Regiment, in Ystad
 Ing 2 - Göta Engineer Regiment, in Eksjö
 T 4 - Scanian Logistic Regiment, in Hässleholm
 Air Force units:
 F 5 - Swedish Air Force Flying School, in Ljungbyhed
 1st Training Squadron with Saab 105A advanced jet trainers
 2nd Training Squadron with Saab 105A advanced jet trainers
 3rd Training Squadron with Saab 105A advanced jet trainers
 4th Training Squadron (Reserve Officers Training)
 5th Training Squadron (Basic Flight Training) with SK 61A and SK 61B planes
 Basic Flight School
 Combat Flight School
 Civil Aviation School
 Aerial Navigation School
 Air Force Meteorology School
 F 10/Se S - Scania Wing / Air Defense Sector South (covering Milo S and Milo V), in Ängelholm
 101st Fighter Squadron, with J 35J Draken fighter aircraft
 102nd Fighter Squadron, with J 35J Draken fighter aircraft
 103rd Fighter Squadron, with J 35J Draken fighter aircraft
 F 17 - Blekinge Wing, in Kallinge
 171st Fighter Squadron, with JA 37 Viggen fighter aircraft
 172nd Recce Squadron, with SF 37 Viggen photo reconnaissance aircraft and SH 37 Viggen maritime reconnaissance/strike aircraft
 Navy units:
 BoMö - Malmö Naval Surveillance, in Malmö
 ÖrlB S/Fo 15 - South Coast Naval Base / Karlskrona Defense District, in Karlskrona
 13th Helicopter Group, at Ronneby Airfield with CH-46B Sea Knight anti-submarine and Bell 206B utility helicopters, and one CASA C-212 Aviocar in anti-submarine configuration
 KA 2 - Karlskrona Coastal Artillery Regiment, in Karlskrona
 Fortress Battalion, with seven 75mm Tornpjäs m/57 batteries in Malmö, Trelleborg, Ystad, Simrishamn, Karlshamn, Järnavik and Aspö, and two 120mm Tornautomatpjäs m/70 batteries in Trelleborg and Ystad
 1st Coastal Artillery Battalion with three batteries with 4x mobile 120mm M/80 cannons each for Scania
 3rd Coastal Artillery Battalion with three batteries with 4x mobile 120mm M/80 cannons each for Blekinge
 1st Mobile Blocking Battalion with one battery with 3x mobile 75mm m/65 guns, one battery with light Robot 52 anti-ship missiles, and a mining troop in Västervik to defend the Orrfjärd Navy Base
 6th Mobile Blocking Battalion with one battery with 3x mobile 75mm m/65 guns, one battery with light Robot 52 anti-ship missiles, and a mining troop for the Eastern coast of Scania
 Heavy Coastal Missile Battery with Robot 08 anti-ship missiles
 Unknown number of Mobile Blocking Companies consisting of a light Robot 52 anti-ship missile troop, and a mining troop
 HSwMS Kalmarsund (13) minelayer
 HSwMS Öresund (18) minelayer
 4th Surface Attack Flotilla, in Karlskrona
 44th Missile Boat Division, with 6x Norrköping-class missile boats
 HSwMS Norrköping (R131)
 HSwMS Nynäshamn (R132)
 HSwMS Norrtälje (R133)
 HSwMS Varberg (R134)
 HSwMS Västerås (R135)
 HSwMS Västervik (R136)
 46th Patrol Boat Division, with 4x Hugin-class patrol boats
 HSwMS Styrbjörn (P163)
 HSwMS Starkodder (P164) 
 HSwMS Tordön (P165)
 HSwMS Tirfing (P166)

In wartime the Southern Military District would have activated the following major land units, as well as a host of smaller units:
 1st Division, in Kristianstad
 13th (Armoured) Division, in Kristianstad
 PB 7 - Malmö Brigade, in Revingehed, a Type 63M armoured brigade based on the P 7 - South Scanian Regiment 
 PB 8 - Göinge Brigade, in Hässleholm, a Type 63M armoured brigade based on the P 2 - Scania Dragoon Regiment
 IB 11 - Kronoberg Brigade, in Växjö, a Type 77 infantry brigade based on the I 11 - Kronoberg Regiment
 IB 12 - Jönköping Brigade, in Eksjö, a Type 66M infantry brigade based on the I 12 - North Småland Regiment
 PB 26 - Kristianstad Brigade, in Kristianstad, a Type 63M armoured brigade based on the P 6 - North Scania Regiment
 IB 41 - Blekinge Brigade, in Växjö, a Type 66M infantry brigade based on the I 11 - Kronoberg Regiment
 IB 42 - Kalmar Brigade, in Eksjö, a Type 77 infantry brigade based on the I 12 - North Småland Regiment

Heraldry and traditions

Coat of arms
The coat of arms of the Southern Military District Staff 1983–1994. Blazon: "Azur, an erect sword with the area letter (S - South) surrounded by an open chaplet of oak leaves, all or."

The coat of arms of the Southern Military District Staff 1994–2000. It was also used by the Southern Military District 2000–2005 and the Western Military Region 2018–present. Blazon: "Azure, with waves argent six times divided bendy-sinister argent, charged with a doubletailed crowned lion rampant or, armed and langued gules. The shield surmounted an erect sword or."

Medals
In 2000, the Södra militärområdesstabens (MilostabS) minnesmedalj ("Southern Military District Staff (MilostabS) Commemorative Medal") in silver (MiloSSMM) of the 8th size was established. The medal is oval in shape and the medal ribbon is of yellow moiré with blue edges and a blue stripe on each side.

Commanding officers

Military commanders

1942–1947: Major General Ernst af Klercker
1947–1947: Major General Carl August Ehrensvärd
1948–1953: Major General Samuel Åkerhielm
1953–1961: Major General Viking Tamm
1961–1963: Major General Curt Göransson
1963–1966: Major General Tage Olihn
1966–1968: Lieutenant General Stig Norén
1968–1972: Vice Admiral Oscar Krokstedt
1972–1980: Lieutenant General Karl Eric Holm
1980–1982: Lieutenant General Sven-Olof Olson
1982–1984: Vice Admiral Bengt Schuback
1984–1988: Lieutenant General Carl Björeman
1988–1992: Lieutenant General Gustaf Welin
1992–1994: Lieutenant General Owe Wiktorin
1994–1998: Lieutenant General Sven-Åke Jansson
1998–2000: Lieutenant General Kent Harrskog

Deputy military commanders

1942–1943: Major general Hugo Gadd
1943–1946: Colonel Sven Colliander
1946–1948: Colonel Viking Tamm
1948–1953: Colonel Sven Erhard Öberg
1953–1954: Colonel Karl Ångström
1955–1962: Lieutenant colonel Miles Flach
1963–1966: Colonel Stig Löfgren
1966–1973: Major general Sigmund Ahnfelt

Chiefs of Staff

1942–1945: Lieutenant colonel Miles Flach
1945–1949: Lieutenant colonel James Axel John Maulé
1949–1951: Lieutenant colonel Wilhelm Reuterswärd
1951–1954: Lieutenant colonel Fred Ljunggren
1954–1957: Lieutenant colonel Carl Gustav Henrik Gideon Linnell
1957–1959: Major Ove Ljung
1959–1966: Lieutenant colonel Valter Thomé
1966–1966: Lieutenant colonel Kjell Nordström
1966–1973: Major general Sigmund Ahnfelt
1973–1978: Rear admiral Rolf Rheborg
1978–1979: Rear admiral Bror Stefenson
1980–1984: Major general Carl Björeman
1984–1988: Rear admiral Göran Wallén
1988–1991: Rear admiral Peter Nordbeck
1991–1993: Senior colonel Hans Arne Hansson
1993–1994: Major general Bertel Österdahl
1994–1999: Major general Ulf Rubarth
1999–2000: Senior colonel Mats Welff

Names, designations and locations

See also
Military district (Sweden)

Footnotes

References

Notes

Print

Web

Military districts of Sweden
Disbanded units and formations of Sweden
Military units and formations established in 1942
Military units and formations disestablished in 2000
1942 establishments in Sweden
2000 disestablishments in Sweden
Kristianstad Garrison